Platnick is a genus of central Asian liocranid sac spiders. It was first described by Yuri M. Marusik and A. A. Fomichev in 2020, and it has only been found in Tajikistan.  it contains only three species: P. astana, P. sanglok, and P. shablyai.

See also
 List of Liocranidae species

References

Liocranidae genera
Endemic fauna of Tajikistan